Darius Jones may refer to:

 Leon Reid IV (born 1979), also known as Darius Jones, American artist
 Darius Jones (saxophonist) (born 1978), American jazz alto saxophonist and composer